Jordan Mancino (born May 22, 1983) is an American drummer. He has played with several metal acts as the official or as a live member, including As I Lay Dying, Killswitch Engage, and Wovenwar. Mancino, alongside the rest of AILD, have stated that the band  may consist of Christians but their music is not just for Christians.

Background 

Jordan Mancino started his musical career with the band Edge of Mortality which played shows with Born Blind and Cast in Stone, one member went on to join Bleeding Through. He later met his longtime friend Tim Lambesis. The duo were in several acts together including Point of Recognition. The two friends left that band and then formed As I Lay Dying. The two formed the band and released six albums, as well as a compilation of cover songs. In 2009, Mancino joined the supergroup Souls of We.

When Lambesis plotted to kill his wife, Mancino, along with AILD's guitarists Phil Sgrosso and Nick Hipa and bassist Josh Gilbert formed a new band called Wovenwar with Shane Blay, Oh, Sleeper's guitarist and vocalist. Mancino recently stated that there is no ill will towards Lambesis. Wovenwar has released two albums, Wovenwar (2014) and Honor Is Dead (2016). In 2016, Mancino filled in for Unearth drummer Nick Pierce for a brief time. Mancino has released several play-through videos, including "Anodyne Sea". In 2017, it was reported that Lambesis resurrected AILD with all new members. It was also stated that none of the original members, including Mancino, would return to the lineup. However in June 2018, it was confirmed the lineup of Mancino, Hipa, Sgrosso, Gilbert and Lambesis have reunited.

Bands 

Current

 Souls of We (2009–present)
 Wovenwar (2013–present)

Live

 Killswitch Engage (2013)
 Unearth (2016)

Former

 Edge of Mortality (1998–2001)
 As I Lay Dying (2000–2014, 2018–2022)
 One Foot Forward (2001)
 Point of Recognition (2001–2002)
 Thieves & Liars (2001–2003)
 Sworn Enemy (2007–2008)

Discography 
As I Lay Dying
Beneath the Encasing of Ashes (2001)
Frail Words Collapse (2003)
Shadows Are Security (2005)
A Long March: The First Recordings (compilation, 2006)
An Ocean Between Us (2007)
The Powerless Rise (2010)
Decas (compilation, 2011)
Awakened (2012)
 Shaped by Fire (2019)

Wovenwar
 Wovenwar (2014)
 Honor Is Dead (2016)

Sworn Enemy
 Maniacal (2008)

References

External links 

 
 
 
 

American drummers
American performers of Christian music
Metal Blade Records artists
Christian metal musicians
Living people
1983 births
As I Lay Dying (band) members
Wovenwar members
Souls of We members
21st-century drummers